Parasocial interaction (PSI) refers to a kind of psychological relationship experienced by an audience in their mediated encounters with performers in the mass media, particularly on television and on online platforms. Viewers or listeners come to consider media personalities as friends, despite having no or limited interactions with them. PSI is described as an illusory experience, such that media audiences interact with personas (e.g., talk show hosts, celebrities, fictional characters, social media influencers) as if they are engaged in a reciprocal relationship with them. The term was coined by Donald Horton and Richard Wohl in 1956.

A parasocial interaction, an exposure that garners interest in a persona, becomes a parasocial relationship after repeated exposure to the media persona causes the media user to develop illusions of intimacy, friendship, and identification. Positive information learned about the media persona results in increased attraction, and the relationship progresses. Parasocial relationships are enhanced due to trust and self-disclosure provided by the media persona. Media users are loyal and feel directly connected to the persona, much as they are connected to their close friends, by observing and interpreting their appearance, gestures, voice, conversation, and conduct. Media personas have a significant amount of influence over media users, positive or negative, informing the way that they perceive certain topics or even their purchasing habits.  Studies involving longitudinal effects of parasocial interactions on children are still relatively new, according to developmental psychologist Sandra L. Calvert.

Social media introduces additional opportunities for parasocial relationships to intensify because it provides more opportunities for intimate, reciprocal, and frequent interactions between the user and persona. These virtual interactions may involve commenting, following, liking, or direct messaging. The consistency in which the persona appears could also lead to a more intimate perception in the eyes of the user.

Evolution of the term
Parasocial interaction was first described from the perspective of media and communication studies. In 1956, Horton and Wohl explored the different interactions between mass media users and media figures and determined the existence of a parasocial relationship (PSR), where the user acts as though they are involved in a typical social relationship. However, parasocial interaction existed before mass media, when a person would establish a bond with political figures, gods or even spirits. Since then, the term has been adopted by psychologists in furthering their studies of the social relationships that emerge between consumers of mass media and the figures they see represented there. Horton and Wohl suggested that for most people, parasocial interactions with persona complement their current social interactions, while also suggesting that there are some individuals who exhibit extreme parasociality, or they substitute parasocial interactions for actual social interactions. Perse and Rubin (1989) contested this view, finding that parasocial interactions occurred as a natural byproduct of time spent with media figures.

Although the concept originated from a psychological topic, extensive research of PSI has been performed in the area of mass communication with manifold results. Psychologists began to show their interest in the concept in the 1980s, and researchers began to develop the concept extensively within the field of communication science. Many important questions about social psychology were raised concerning the nature of these relationships that are problematic for existing theories in those fields. The concept of parasocial interaction and detailed examination of the behavioral phenomena that it seeks to explain have considerable potential for developing psychological theory.

The conceptual development of parasocial interaction (PSI) and parasocial relationship (PSR) are interpreted and employed in different ways in various literatures. When it is applied in the use-and-gratifications (U&G) approaches, the two concepts are typically treated interchangeably, with regard primarily to a special type of "interpersonal involvement" with media figures that includes different phenomena such as interaction and identification. In contrast to the U&G approaches, research domains such as media psychology and semiotics argue for a clear distinction between the terms.

PSI specifically means the "one-sided process of media person perception during media exposure", whereas PSR stands for "a cross-situational relationship that a viewer or user holds to a media person, which includes specific cognitive and affective components". Schmid & Klimmt (2011) further argue that PSI and PSR are progressive states such that what begins as a PSI has the potential to become a PSR. Dibble, Hartmann and Rosaen (2016) suggest that a PSR can develop without a PSI occurring, such as when the characters do not make a direct connection with the viewer. In sum, the terms, definitions, and models explicating PSI and PSR differ across scientific backgrounds and traditions. For example, Dibble et al. (2016) argued that PSI and PSR are often "conflated conceptually and methodologically". To test their assertion, they tested for parasocial indicators with two different scales used for parasocial inquiry: the traditional PSI-Scale and the newer EPSI-Scale, and compared results between the two. The traditional PSI-Scale, along with modified forms of it, is the most widely used measure of PSI assessment. However, Dibble et al. (2016) found evidence supporting their hypothesis that the newer EPSI-Scale was a better measure of PSIs and that the traditional scale merely revealed participants' liking of characters. Because of varying conceptions, it is difficult for researchers to reach a consensus.

Scientific research
Studying social interaction, and by extension parasocial interaction (PSI), follows a social cognitive approach to defining individual cognitive activity. Accordingly, there are similar psychological processes at work in both parasocial relationships and face-to-face interactions. However, the parasocial relationship does not follow the process of the typical long-term relationship. The media user remains a stranger to the media figure, whereas this "strangeness" would gradually evaporate in typical social interaction. Many parasocial relationships fulfill the needs of typical social interaction, but potentially reward insecurity. Many who possess a dismissive attachment style to others may find the one-sided interaction to be preferable in lieu of dealing with others, while those who experience anxiety from typical interactions may find comfort in the lives of celebrities consistently being present. Additionally, whatever a celebrity or online figure may do can provoke emotional responses from their audiences—some even going as far as suffering from negative feelings because of it.

The research of PSI obtained significant interest after the advent of the uses and gratifications approach to mass communication research in the early 1970s. A study of early soap opera identified two essential functions of PSI: companionship and personal identity. Rosengren and Windahl further argued that PSI could be identified in the process of viewers' interacting with media figures, but such interaction did not produce identification. This is an important distinction, because identification has a longer history than PSI. Subsequent research has indicated that PSI is evident when identification is not present. During last several decades, PSI has been documented in the research analyzing the relationship between audience members and television newscasters, TV and radio talk-show hosts, sitcom characters and other TV celebrities or performers. Research has also been conducted on how a favorable PSI can be facilitated between celebrities and their followers on social media, specifically through the interactions followers have with the celebrities posts on social media. Although different PSI scales have been employed in these studies, PSI was clearly documented with each persona.

Noticing the importance of media in the area of psychological research, academic David Giles asserted in his 2002 paper that there is a need for PSI research to move away from the field of mass communication and into the field of psychology. Studies in this area are commonly conducted by focusing a key psychological issue for PSI: concerning the similarity between parasocial relations and ordinary social relations. For example, academic John Turner adopted the idea of homophily (i.e., the tendency for friendships to form between people that are alike in some designated respect) to examine the interpersonal and psychological predictors of parasocial interaction with television performers. The author found that one dimension of homophily (i.e., attitude) was the best predictor of parasocial interaction. Hataway indicated that although there seems to be prevailing to analyze PSI in the domain of social psychology, a solid connection to psychological theory and developmental theory has been missing. Hataway  further suggested that more psychological research is needed in order to develop parasocial theory. Specific issues cited were "how parasocial relationships are derived from parasocial interaction and the way those relationships further influence media usage as well as a social construction of reality, and how parasocial interaction is cognitively produced". He saw that the majority of PSI research has been conducted by mass communication scholars as a weakness and called for psychologists to refer to Giles's 2002 paper for directions of studies.

Another important consideration for the study of PSI at a psychological level is that there is a form of PSI existing even in interpersonal social situation. People may use fundamentally the same cognitive processes in both interpersonal and mediated communication. Giles's 2002 paper also suggested that the element of direct interaction occurred in mediated interaction, such as talking to a presenter or celebrity guest, may continue in social interaction, with a cartoon character or a fictional protagonist in the mind. This may finally constitute a new way of interpreting social interaction. A further consideration is application of social cognitive approaches in individual levels. It is traditionally accepted that this approach is inadequate by itself for the study of relationships. However, a number of growing literature on the role of imagination in social interaction suggests that some imaginative activity (e.g., imaginary friends) may be an influential factor in the outcome of real social interaction. PSI is nowadays regarded as an extension of normal social cognition, specifically in terms of the use of the imagination. Current PSI literature commonly acknowledge that the psychological processes acting at the individual level parallel those used in ordinary social activity and relationship building.

Psychological implications during childhood

The formation of parasocial relationships occurs frequently among adolescents, often creating one-sided and unreciprocated bonds with celebrities they encounter in the media. Parasocial interaction is best explored across a lifespan, which explains the growing focus on parasocial interaction in children and adolescents. Studies conducted have found differences between young girls and boys and how each group engages in parasocial behaviour. Adolescent boys have the tendency to favour male athletes, as opposed to adolescent girls who preferred celebrities such as musicians or actresses. Additionally, sex-role stereotyping is more common in children ages 5–6, but decreases in children age 10–11. Existing literature also intimates that attachments, parasocial or otherwise, established in early childhood, are highly influential on relationships created later in life. Many studies have focused on adolescent girls because they are more likely to form a strong bond with a media figure and be influenced in terms of lifestyle choices.

Positive consequences

Identity formation 

The primary effect is that of learning: consistent with Bandura's (1986) social cognitive theory, much evidence shows that children learn from positive and negative televised role models, and acquire norms and standards for conduct through media outlets such as television and video games. This is supported by a study by Cynthia Hoffner with children aged 7–12, which showed that the gender of children's favorite televised characters was strongly correlated to the gender of the children. Furthermore, the research showed "wishful identification" with parasocial relationships, namely, that boys preferred intelligence, while girls preferred attractiveness when picking favorite characters. These alternatives are both enhanced and mitigated by their separation from reality. Parasocial interactions are particularly appealing to adolescents in the throes of identity formation and increasing autonomy from parents because these relationships provide idealized figures with whom the adolescent can envision total acceptance. The lack of actual contact with these idealized figures can offer positive social interactions without risk of rejection or consequent feelings of unworthiness. One cannot know everything about a media figure or icon, allowing adolescents to attach fantasized attributes onto these figures in order to meet their own specific wants or needs. On the other hand, entities far removed from reality tend to be less influential on children.

A study by Rosaen and Dibble examined correlation between realism of favorite television character and strength of parasocial relationships. Results showed a positive correlation between social realism (how realistic the character is) and strength of parasocial relationships. Results also show age-related differences among children. Older children tended to prefer more realistic characters, while younger children generally had more powerful parasocial relationships with any character. Age, however, did not impact the correlation between social realism and strength of parasocial interaction, which suggests that more real characters are grounds for more powerful parasocial relationships in children of all ages.

Learning through the media 

Parasocial relationships may be formed during an individual's early childhood. In particular, toddlers have a tendency to form parasocial connections with characters that they are exposed to from TV shows and film. Children's television shows, such as Dora the Explorer, involve the show's characters directly addressing the audience. The result is young children participating in "pseudo-conversations" with the on-screen characters. The process of engagement and interaction lead children to creating a one-sided bond where they believe that they have formed a relationship with these fictional characters, viewing them as friends. Exposure to this type of media often leads to opportunities for learning. Research has shown that children are more capable of grasping a concept if a character that they are parasocially connected to is the one to present it to them.

The ability to learn from parasocial relationships is directly correlated to the strength of the relationship, as has been shown in work by Sandra L. Calvert and colleagues. In a 2011 study by Lauricella, Gola, and Calvert, eight 21-month-old infants were taught seriation sequencing by one of two characters. One character, Elmo, is iconic in American culture and therefore socially meaningful, and the other, DoDo, although popular with children in Taiwan, is less well known in American media. Children were better able to learn from the socially meaningful character (Elmo) than from the character who was less easily recognized (DoDo). Furthermore, children could become better able to learn from less socially-relevant characters such as DoDo, by developing a parasocial relationship with that character. Accordingly, after children were given DoDo toys to play with, their ability to learn from that character increased. In a later study, this effect was found to be greatest when children showed stronger parasocial relationships: Children's success on the seriation task, and therefore their ability to learn from a less familiar character, was greatest for children who exhibited more emotional nurturing behaviors toward the DoDo toy during play.

Personalization of a character makes a child more likely to nurture the character, and thus more likely to form a parasocial relationship that would improve learning from videos featuring the character. In place of DoDo and Elmo, a 2014 study instead gave children Scout and Violet dolls. These interactive plush toy dogs can be programmed to say a child's name and have particular favorites (i.e., a favorite food, color, and song). 18-month-old children were given either personalized toys (matched for gender, programmed to say the child's name, and programmed to have the same favorites as the child) or non-personalized toys (the opposite gender, programmed to call the children "Pal" and have random favorites). At the end of the study, children who had received personalized dolls were better able to learn from their characters than were children who had received non-personalized toys. Children also nurtured personalized toys more than non-personalized toys. It seems that perceived similarities increase children's interest and investment in the characters, which motivates the development of parasocial relationships and helps improve later screen-based learning.

Negative consequences

In the past two decades, people have become increasingly interested in the potential negative impacts media has on people's behavior and cognition. Many researchers have begun to look more closely at how people's relationships with various media outlets affect behavior, self-perception and attachment styles, and specifically in regards to creating parasocial relationships.

Body image 

Further research has examined these relationships with regard to body image and self-perception. Interest in this more narrow area of research has increased as body image issues have become more prevalent in today's society.

A study was conducted to examine the relationship between media exposure and adolescents' body image. Specifically, researchers looked at parasocial relationships and the different motivations for self-comparison with a character. This study surveyed 391 7th and 8th grade students and found that media exposure negatively predicted body image. In addition to the direct negative impact, the study indicated that parasocial relationships with favorite characters, motivations to self-compare, and engagement in social comparison with characters amplified the negative effects on kids' body images. Furthermore, the researchers found that making social comparisons with favorite characters distorted actual, or ideal, body image and self-perception. Studies have been done exploring these effects across gender.

A study examined the parasocial relationships between men and superheroes; the study looked at muscular versus non-muscular superheroes and men who either did or did not develop a one-sided psychological bond with a superhero character. The results from this study indicated a significant impact on body image, particularly when exposed to muscular superhero characters. Research conducted by Ariana F. Young, Shira Gabriel, and Jordan L. Hollar in 2013 showed that men who did not form a parasocial relationship with a muscular superhero had poor self-perception and felt negative about their bodies after exposure to the muscular character. However, if the men had a PSR with the superhero, the negative effects on body satisfaction were eliminated.

The increasing presence of beauty filters on social media has also played a large role in users' body image. On Facebook, within the first year filters were available, over 400,000 creators released and utilized over 1.2 million filters. These filters were consistently seen by billions of viewers, as more than 150 creators surpassed 1 billion views on their content. These filters edit the appearance of the creator which can give a false reality to viewers.

Aggression 

Further studies have looked into parasocial relationships and more specifically at the impacts on violent and aggressive behavior. A study done by Keren Eyal and Alan M. Rubin examined aggressive and violent television characters and the potential negative impacts they may have on viewers. The study was based on social cognitive theory and looked at trait aggression in viewers and identification and parasocial interaction with aggressive characters. The researchers measured trait aggression in each of the participants and compared that to the level of identification with aggressive characters. The study found that more aggressive viewers were more likely to identify with aggressive characters and further develop parasocial relationships with the aggressive characters.

Parasocial interaction has been linked to psychological attachment theory and its consequences have seen the same dramatic effects as real relationship breakups. In considering the relationship between parasocial interaction and attachment styles, Jonathan Cohen found that individuals who were more anxious media consumers tended to be more invested in parasocial relationships.

In parasocial interaction there is no "normal" social interaction; it is a very one-sided relationship. The knowledgeable side has no direct control over the actions of the side it observes, and it is very difficult for it to contact and influence it.

Parasocial breakup 

While much research focuses on the formation and maintenance of parasocial relationships, other research has begun to focus on what happens when a parasocial relationship is dissolved. Eyal and Cohen define parasocial breakup as "a situation where a character with whom a viewer has developed a PSR goes off the air". The distress that media consumers experienced after a parasocial breakup was quite similar to that of a social relationship. However, the emotional distress experienced after the parasocial breakup was weaker than that of the real life interpersonal relationship. Lather and Moyer-Guse also considered the concept of parasocial breakup, but in a more temporary sense. While the study focused on parasocial breakups as a result of the writers' strike from 2007 to 2008, the researchers found that media consumers still experienced different levels of emotional distress. This study, like previous studies, showed that parasocial relationships operate very similarly to real-life relationships.

On the Internet

In 1998, John Eighmey, from Iowa State University, and Lola McCord, from the University of Alabama, published a study titled "Adding Value in the Information Age: Uses and Gratifications of Sites on the World Wide Web." In the study, they observed that the presence of parasocial relationships constituted an important determinant of website visitation rates. "It appears," the study states, "that websites projecting a strong sense of personality may also encourage the development of a kind of parasocial relationship with website visitors."

In 1999, John Hoerner, from the University of Alabama, published a study titled "Scaling the Web: A Parasocial Interaction Scale for World Wide Web Sites", in which he proposed a method for measuring the effects of parasocial interaction on the Internet. The study explained that websites may feature "personae" that host to the visitors to the sites in order to generate public interest. Personae, in some cases, are nothing more than the online representations of the actual people, often prominent public figures, but sometimes, according to the study, will be the fictional creations of the sites' webmasters. Personae "take on many of the characteristics of a [real-life] companion, including regular and frequent appearances, a sense of immediacy...and the feeling of a face-to-face meeting." Additionally, the study makes the point that, even when no such personae have been created, parasocial relationships might still develop. Webmasters might foster parasocial interactions through a conversational writing style, extensive character development and opportunities for email exchange with the website's persona.

Hoerner used the Parasocial Interaction (PSI) scale, developed by Rubin, Perse, and Powell in 1985, and modified the scale to more accurately assess parasocial interactions on the Internet. They used the scale to gauge participants' reactions to a number of different websites, and, more generally, to determine whether or not parasocial interaction theory could be linked to Internet use. The study concluded, first, that parasocial interaction is not dependent on the presence of a traditional persona on a website; data showed that websites with described "strong personae" did not attract significantly more hits than other websites selected by the study conductors. "The literal, mediated personality from the newscast or soap opera of the past [around which the original PSI-scale was framed] is gone. The design metaphor, flow of the web experience, and styles of textual and graphic presentations of the information all become elements of a website persona and encourage parasocial interaction by the visitor/user with that persona."

Social media 
Though most literature has focused on parasocial interaction as a television and film phenomenon, new technologies, namely the Internet, have necessitated a closer look at such interactions. The applications of PSI to computer-mediated environments are continuously documented in literature of the last decade. Many researchers concluded that, just as parasocial relationships are present in television and radio, they are also present in online environments such as blogs and other social networking sites. Through an exploration of followers on politicians' blogs, academics Kjerstin Thorson and Shelly Rodgers found that parasocial interacting with the politician influences people's opinions about the politician, and promotes them to vote for the politician. Social media is designed to be a new channel through which parasocial interaction/relationship can be formed. Research has shown that interacting with individuals through blogs and social media such as Twitter can influence the perceptions of those individuals. As Internet users become more active on social media platforms such as Facebook and Twitter, followers often feel more engaged with them, making the parasocial relationships stronger.

Social media is defined as "Internet-based applications that build on the ideological and technological foundations of Web 2.0 and that allow the creation and exchange of user-generated content". While the usage of social media for personal means is common, the use of social media by celebrities has given them an opportunity to have a larger platform for personal causes or brand promotion by facilitating word-of-mouth. Social media networks inherit at least one key attribute from the Internet, in that they offer open accessibility for all users. Philip Drake and Andy Miah argue that the Internet, and therefore social networks and blogs, downsize the gatekeeping processes that exist in other mass media forms. They further state that this means that online information can spread unfiltered and thus does not rest on strict framework conditions such as those on television or in newspapers. This, however, remains subject to an ongoing debate within research. Through presence on social media platforms, stars and celebrities attempt on the one hand to participate in the production of their image; on the other hand, they must remain present in these media in order to stay on the media's and consequently on the audience's agenda. According to Daschmann, celebrities all have to compete for the public's (limited) attention. In such a competitive environment a famous person must therefore remain present on all the accessible media channels.

Twitter 

Twitter is one of the most popular social media platforms and a common choice for celebrities who want to chat with their fans without divulging personal access information. In 2013, the analysis from Stever and Lawson assumed that Twitter can be used to learn about parasocial interaction and the study provided a first step in that endeavor. The study included a sample of 12 entertainment media celebrities, 6 males and 6 females, all taken from 2009 to 2012 Twitter feeds. The result showed that, although fans interacting with celebrities via Twitter have limited access to communicate with the celebrity, the relationship is still parasocial even though a fan might receive the occasional reply from the celebrity. Twitter can provide a direct connection between followers and celebrities or influencers that gives access to everyday information. It is an entertaining way for most fans since Twitter enables them to be a part of life that they enjoy. 

The more followers one has on Twitter, the greater perceived social influence one has. This is particularly because tweets are broadcast to every follower, who may then retweet these posts to their own followers, which are then rebroadcast to thousands of other Twitter members. Seen as the equivalent to a movie earning a box-office hit or a single track hitting the top of the Billboard charts, the phenomenon of "trending" (i.e., words tagged at a higher rate than others on a social media platform) on Twitter grants users the ability to earn influence on the platform. Twitter, alongside other social media websites, can be utilized by its users as a form of gaining social capital.

Online video and livestreaming 
Academics at the 2022 Hawaii International Conference on System Sciences referred to interactions on livestreaming services as "cyber-social relations"; they stated that these interactions "take a middle position between" social (there are no spatial proximity and no bodily contact) and parasocial relations (as there is reciprocity and temporal proximity).

YouTube 

YouTube, a social media platform dedicated to sharing video-related content produced by its users, has grown in popularity to become a form of media that's likened to television for the current generation. By content creators granting insight into their daily lives through the practice of vlogging, viewers form close one-sided relationships with these creators that manifest in comment chains, fan art and consistent responses with the creator in question. Parasocial interaction and relationships are commonly formed between the creators and their audiences due to the creator's desire to interact with their fanbase through comments or posts. Many creators share "personal" details of their lives, even if there is little authenticity in the polished identity they convey online. 

The interaction between viewers and celebrities is not limited to product placement or branding – the viewers could socialize with celebrities or influencers that they might not have any chance to contact in reality. Megan Farokhmanesh, for The Verge, wrote that parasocial relationships "are vital to YouTubers' success, and they are what turns viewers into a loyal community. ... Viewers who feel friendship or intimacy with their favorite creators can also have higher expectations and stronger reactions when those expectations are disappointed. ... Because creators often earn money off their fans through memberships, Patreons, and other cash avenues, there are fans who feel entitled to specific details about the lives of creators or even specific content. ... The divide between creators' lives and their work is a fine line".

In a study conducted by Google in 2017, a reported 40% of millennial YouTube subscribers claimed their "favorite creators understands them better than their friends." For many viewers, parasocial relationships check off the four factors that are defined by Mark Granovetter's "The Strength of Weak Ties" theory: intimacy is gained by the creator's sharing of personal details, by which their viewers may react emotionally; viewers dedicate time to watching content the creator uploads; and what the creator posts—whether sponsored or not—may make the viewer feel as if they are being offered something, like a favor.

Twitch 

Twitch, a video livestreaming service with focuses such as video game live streaming, creative content, and "in real life" streams, has also grown in popularity since launching in June 2011. Twitch's platform encourages creators to directly engage with their fans. According to research, a large draw towards the website is the aspect of users directly participating in a livestream through the chat function. In turn, streamers interact with their audience by greeting them by username or addressing their messages in comments. As noted in one study, this type of interaction forms "a sense of community". Additionally, Twitch livestreams create a digital "third place", a term coined by Ray Oldenburg that describes a public and informal get-together of individuals that are foundational to building a community. This sense of community is further enhanced when users become regular participants of a stream, either by watching live shows frequently or subscribing to the creator. Subscribing to a Twitch channel is another way in which viewers participate in a live stream. This is a considered a form of digital patronage where audiences pay money to financially support a creator. Forming what an audience member perceives as a personal relationship with their favourite streamer plays a large role whether or not they choose to subscribe.

Wired stated that Twitch pioneered "the digital parasocial thing. More specifically, monetizing it on a massive scale". David Finch, in the book Implications and Impacts of eSports on Business and Society, highlighted that streamers on Twitch have many options to monetize their content such as donations through Twitch, channel subscriptions and ad revenue; additionally, Twitch is more associated with livestreaming than YouTube and has "a much higher degree of interaction" between the content creator and the viewer. Finch wrote that "the popularity of Twitch parallels other emerging digital media forms in that it is user-generated, draws on parasocial relationships established online and establishes intimacy in new ways. ... Twitch viewers might similarly regard their time on their favourite Twitch channels as familiar, hilarious and informative encounters with their gaming pals". 

Academics Time Wulf, Frank Schneider, and Stefan Beckert found that parasocial relationships are a key component to a Twitch streamer's success and the audience's enjoyment of Twitch; particularly, Twitch's chat features can foster this relationship. They highlighted that "professional streamers have a personal schedule of streaming times so that users can rely on seeing their friends again—similar to characters of a periodic TV show. Therefore, viewers are able to maintain their relationships to streamers. The stronger bonds between viewers and streamers grow, the more users may root for their favorite streamer's success". The Guardian also highlighted the interactive nature of Twitch and that the "format is extremely good at cultivating community, a virtual hangout spot for its millions of teenage and college-age users".

Twitch streamers have also discussed the negatives associated with these parasocial relationships such as harassment and stalking by fans. Cecilia D'Anastasio, for Kotaku, wrote that "Twitch streamers are like digital-age geisha. They host, they entertain, they listen, they respond. They perform their skill—gaming, in most cases—from behind a thick veneer of familiarity. Maybe it's because they let viewers into their homes, or because the live-streaming format feels candid or because of their unprecedented accessibility, but there's something about being an entertainer on Twitch that blurs the line between viewer and friend. It can be hard to keep a healthy distance from fans. And, for fans, it can occasionally be hard to tell the difference between entertainer and companion". The Verge and the HuffPost have both specifically highlighted the harassment female Twitch streamers experience. Jesselyn Cook, for HuffPost, wrote that "most all women who earn a living on Twitch know what it's like to have male viewers who, after spending countless hours watching them in real time, develop obsessive feelings of romantic and sexual entitlement. The result is an environment where extreme harassment, rape and death threats, blackmailing, stalking and worse have become regular workplace hazards. Female streamers who spoke to HuffPost said they wish they'd known before joining Twitch that they were also signing up for a torrent of endless, dehumanizing harassment with little to no recourse".

Podcasters
Podcasts, episodic series of spoken-word digital audio files that a user can download to a personal device, are also known for fostering parasocial relationships between podcasters and listeners. As early as 2012, Robert C. MacDougall wrote "The podcast, and particularly the podcast listened to on the move, may be part of an evolution in parasocial phenomena and a fundamentally new part of mediated interpersonal communication. Podcasts enhance the personal feel and all attendant psychodynamic effects of Fessenden's primordial radio show."

Laith Zuraikat wrote on "The Parasocial Nature of the Podcast" in his book Radio's Second Century (2020). Author Wil Williams wrote, "there is a difference between feeling a friendship, a sense of comfort, between yourself and a podcaster, and assuming that friendship to be real. Something that makes podcasters appealing is that they have an everyman quality to them: anyone can make a podcast, and this means that in many genres, podcasters feel more "normal" than creators in other mediums. It's easy to feel like podcasters would be your friend if you ever met: it's likely the listener is of the same socioeconomic status as the podcaster, sharing not only other basic demographics as the podcaster, but also their interests, jokes, and philosophies."

In The Guardian, Rachel Aroesti wrote about how, during the lockdowns necessitated by the COVID-19 pandemic, "podcasters replaced our real friends […] providing companionship that is increasingly difficult to distinguish from the real thing." She wrote how "Podcasts are intimate, with no in-the-room audience to remind you of your own distance."

Semantic scholar Mikhaela Nadora (Portland State University) wrote that "[Parasocial relationships] with podcast hosts may cultivate the same way real-life relationships do. As social relationships are important to us, with the new self-autonomous and personalized advances in our media and technology landscape, we can have the same intimate relationships with media figures."

Commercial influences 
Parasocial interaction (PSI) theory was used to understand consumers' purchasing behavior in online context. With the development of social media, such as Facebook, Twitter, Instagram, and YouTube, both companies and consumers start to use social commerce platforms more frequently. Many studies indicate that, among various factors affecting consumers' purchase decision on SCPs, such as credibility of products, parasocial interaction exerts more potential influence on users' final decisions. Sokolova and Kefi conducted a study with large data set (1209 respondents) from the audiences of four popular influencers in the beauty and fashion sector in France to discover the influence of parasocial interaction and credibility on consumers' purchase intention. Their study discovers that younger generations value parasocial interaction and their personal attachment to influencers more than credibility.

On the social commerce platforms, users intend to build parasocial interaction, one with other users, one with celebrities.

PSI with other users 
Certain social media users are active creators of online content, such as personal experiences, ideas, reviews, for targeted audience, which are called influencers. Influencers can become experts, similar to celebrities to some extent, and their posts may influence products and brands and affect potential customers, i.e. their followers. The users in a social commerce platform "meet" with other users and influencers through the images, videos, and feedbacks that they share on the social media. By the time, after multiples times of "meetings", the imaginary intimacy is improved, and the users will deliberately maintain the online friendship, which is a parasocial interaction. Influencers on the social media platforms often comment on the products they have tested, and promote them online to other users by providing their feelings and self-experiences along with images and videos. 

Some brands have their Instagram influencer marketing strategies to increase followers' buying intention and trustworthiness perception. Under the parasocial relationship, users intend to rely on the images or comments that influencers had on the products, which will influence consumers' final decisions. Thus, many social commerce merchants utilize this psychological implication, and sift beautiful images and positive comments on products to provide users a more intuitive shopping experience. For instance, the occurrence and popularity of vlog creates a social space where strangers can share feelings and build intimate relationship. Followers of influencers would make a comparison of the tastes between themselves and the celebrities or influencers they watch, so that PSI has generated among them. Many merchants pay vlogger for recommending and persuading their subscribers to purchase the products. Vlogs provide vivid visual experience for viewers, and the audience could perceive the closeness with the vloggers that build a virtual relationship like face to face via this media. The audience may be influenced by those vlogs and vloggers to make their purchasing decisions.

PSI with celebrities 
PSI relationships are more readily formed between social media user and celebrities. On social media, celebrities build and strengthen more intimate relationships with consumers and fans. Celebrities' self-disclosure could allow their fans and audience get connected with those celebrities and stimulate their illusion of in-person relationship with celebrities. Simultaneously, the context of SCPs, supported by Web 2.0 social media technologies, stimulates users' parasocial interactions with celebrities and experts. Uncertainty reduction theory is an example of a way that this can occur. The process of repeated exposure to an individual gradually reduces the user's level of uncertainty, which increases the user's chances of liking this celebrity. Also, on some social shopping websites, users could also follow celebrities and interact with those people to generate an illusionary bond between the celebrities and themselves. Repeated exposure to the celebrity gives users a sense of predictability in their actions, which engenders a sense of loyalty. PSI help increased more social attractions for celebrities and more credibility that the customers could trust. 

Users who are immersed in celebrity-fans PSI may affirm their loyalty through various activities, including purchasing products endorsed by celebrities. Unlike influencers, celebrities bring their fans with stronger impulse purchase. Targeted consumers (fans) desire to interact with celebrities, instead of passively receiving information from celebrities. By purchasing and supporting the celebrity endorsing products, fans may build more intimate relationship with celebrities in their imagination. In a 2014 journal article, Seung-A Annie Jin and Joe Phua discussed how they conducted studies to determine multiple hypothesis based on the number of followers a celebrity had in correlation to the trust that imparted onto a consumer. This study was done in terms of a celebrity endorsing a product and the likelihood of the consumer to purchase the product after seeing the promotion. Consumers perceived the celebrity with a high number of followers as being more physically attractive, trustworthy, and competent. A high number of followers on the celebrity endorser's profile also significantly increased consumers' intention to build an online friendship with the celebrity. The study found that if a celebrity with a higher number of followers was perceived as more trustworthy, the consumer exhibited significantly higher postexposure product involvement and buying intention as opposed to those who were exposed to a celebrity with a lower follower count. Merchants on social commerce platforms will find huge potentials of analyzing and applying parasocial interactions to manipulate consumers' purchase intention. In addition to influencing fans to purchase products, celebrities can also influence fans to engage in similar conversational styles. Fans, or audience members, in parasocial relationships may "appear to be accommodating to characters' linguistic styles". As fans continue to interact in a parasocial relationship, there is potential for them to mirror the conversational style of the celebrity while communicating on different platforms of social media.

PSI with companies 
As social media relationships grew between celebrities and influencers, businesses created social media profiles for audience engagement. Fast food restaurants have started comedy Twitter accounts to interact with their customers in a personal way. The companies' Twitter accounts respond to tweets from customers, tell jokes and engage in the online industry in ways that create PSI with the consumers. This strategy is working. A study done by Lauren I. Labrecque in 2013 found that customers have higher loyalty intentions and are more likely to provide information for the brand when the brand fostered PSIs. The study also showed that these outcomes were less likely when the consumer felt the response from the company's social media account were automated. Furthermore, including personal details and behind-the-scenes ideation in interactions with consumers also triggers PSI and results in a positive impact. Another parasocial interaction usage in organizational communication is that CEOs' social media image also contributes to the company's image and reputation. Therefore, CEOs have paid attention to their communication with customers, employees, and investors. They would improve their public features through social media to communicate with the stakeholders.

Livestreaming 

According to Ko and Chen (2020), "Live streaming was originally used in broadcasting sporting events or news issues on TV. As the mobile Internet gets more and more popular, now the netizen and small companies can broadcast themselves via the use of live-streaming APP". Many platforms have developed and launched their live stream function, like Taobao.com and Facebook. For online retailers like Taobao.com or Tmall.com, users could follow and interact with the hosts and celebrities like being friends with them. "China had up to 433 million live streaming viewers in August 2019 [CNNIC 2019]. The use of live streaming to promote brands and products is "exploding" in the E-commerce field in China [Aliresearch 2020]. For example, during the "June 18" event in 2019, Taobao's live streaming platform drove sales of 13 billion yuan, with the number of merchants broadcasting live streaming increasing by nearly 120% year-on-year. The number of broadcasts grew by 150% year- on-year [CNNIC 2019]." From the perspective of a retailer, live streaming provides more opportunities for marketing, branding, improving customer services and increasing revenue. As a customer, live streaming also offers a more synchronic and interactive shopping experience than before. Interactions between streamers/sellers and consumers also help customers get higher quality information about the products, which is different from traditional shopping method.

According to Xu, Wu and Li (2020), "streaming commerce creates a novel shopping environment that provides multiple stimuli to motivate potential consumers to indulge in their shopping behaviors. It has emerged and shows great potential as a novel business model to add dynamic real-time interaction among sellers (streamers) and consumers (viewers), provide accurate information, and involve hedonic factors to attract consumers to indulge in consumption processes. Viewers are enabled to obtain dynamic and accurate information by watching live streams, develop virtual social relationships with streamers, and enjoy relaxing and entertaining hours while watching attractive streamers". Livestreaming permit the viewers and the streamers engage in a real-time interaction to create intimacy and closeness, thus, the credibility and trustworthiness would be reinforced through dynamic interactions. In America, retailers like Amazon and QVC have also worked on their own live streaming shopping platforms to take this huge advantage. Interpersonal relations on livestreaming services occupy a position in between social and parasocial relations, giving livestreaming an exceptional position in the entire landscape of social media.

Limitations 
Most studies find that PSI only occurs as friendship, which is overly restrictive theoretically and practically. It is common that people may build parasocial interactions with certain media figures, even though they do not consider to be "friends", such as a villain in a show. Though PSI with disliked figures occurs less likely than with heroes and positive characters, the situation of "love to hate" relationship with disliked characters still occurs. Some researchers realize the restriction of limiting PSIs as friendship, which may preclude them from capture broader situation of meaningful media user reactions. In 2010, Tian and Hoffner conduct an online questionnaire measuring the responses from 174 participants to a liked, neutral, or disliked character from the ABC drama Lost. All participants reported the identification they had perceived with the character, as well as the parasocial interaction and how did they try to change their perspectives to be more like the character. According to the whole sample, perceived similarity was a significant positive predictor of both identification and parasocial interaction. Undeniably, parasocial interaction was higher for liked than for neutral and disliked characters based on the study. Parasocial interaction still appeared with liked, neutral and disliked characters. The prevailing perspective of PSI as a friendship is not appropriate based on the theoretical and experimental findings, and many researchers start to improve the measurement of the PSI's concept.

Future research

One direction for future PSI concerns the advancement of methodology. As theories become more defined and complex, experiments seem to be necessary to be employed in testing hypotheses. Because the meanings of perception and emotion take up much of what parasocial interaction/relationship research interest, the cause and effect is hard to be distinguished and potential spuriousness is difficult to be avoided. For example, whether similarity precedes PSI and whether mediated interaction create a sense of similarity requires experimental validation.

Cohen also suggested that different types of relationships are encouraged to be analyzed within different genres, which particularly challenges scholars in examining the mediated relationship in reality TV shows (e.g., Survivor). These prototypical reality shows are built around narratives, displaying a lot of emotions which seem to solicit empathy and identification, and also demonstrating the characters' skills towards developing fandom. Ratings and audience responses provide strong evidence that those reality shows create significant mediated relationship, but future inquiries should examine whether this new kind of mediated interaction/relationship evolves or do these interactions/relationships conform to existing patterns.

The influence of media in childhood has received little attention from developmental psychologists, even though children have a high degree of exposure to media. While many studies and experiments have explored the nature of parasocial relationships, there are many opportunities for future research. For example, a potential future area of research could be the issue of reruns, where the relationships have outcomes which are already known or well-established. In addition, another area of research could focus on production techniques or televisual approaches. This would include techniques such as chiaroscuro or flat lighting, the strategic placement of close-ups or establishing shots, deductive or inductive shot sequences, hip hop editing, or desaturation. These techniques have long been theorized to have some sort of influence on the formation of parasocial relationships, but their influence has yet to be determined.

The prevailing use of social media and its impact on mediated relationships also requires further study of PSI. Different social media platforms provide channels through which celebrities communicate with their followers easily, making parasocial interaction/relationships seem less unidirectional and perhaps more satisfying and intense. As such, whether social media has made PSI more a part of everyday life needs further exploration. Technological development has been raising questions regarding the role of PSI in our social lives, as media content is available in more places and times. Our mediated friends are never too far away; instead, they actually rest in our pockets and sleep in our beds. Whether this means that we spend more time and effort on cultivating these relationships and will be less dependent on real social relationships, needs further exploration.

Other concerns include the continuity of media figures representation across various media outlets, and the notion of parasocial interaction as compensation for lack of social outlets. Popstars, for example, may not only appear on television, but on several different television or radio programs, as either a chat guest or a performer; further repeated viewings of these stars would intensify visual aspects of parasocial interaction with that star. Most research has typically characterized media users as a television viewer who is often solitary and in need of social interaction. The different types of user-figure interaction can be addressed by conceptualizing parasocial interaction as an extension of ordinary social interaction. Through close examination of social encounters that are significant for parasocial relationships, we can continue to distinguish between parasocial interaction as an isolated activity and as longer-term interaction.

Focus on relationships

Background
The terms parasocial interactions and parasocial relationships were coined by anthropologist Donald Horton and sociologist R. Richard Wohl in 1956, laying the foundation for the topic within the field of communication studies. Originating from psychology, parasocial phenomena comes from a wide range of scientific backgrounds and methodological approaches. The study of parasocial relationships has increased with the growth of mass and social media such as Facebook, Twitter, and Instagram, particularly by those investigating advertising effectiveness and journalism. Horton and Wohl have stated that television personas offer the media user a sense of intimacy and have influence over them by using their appearance and gesture in a way that is seen as being engaging, directly addressing the audience, and conversing with them in a friendly and personal manner. By viewing media personas regularly and feeling a sense of trust with the persona, parasocial relationships offer the media user a continuous relationship that intensifies.

Celebrity endorsements and advertising
Advertising and marketing can use media personas to increase brand awareness, keep media users engaged, and increase purchase intention by seeking out attractive media personas. If media personas show that they are interested in and engage in rewarding interactions with media users, then if the media user likes the persona they will reciprocate interactions and over time form a parasocial relationship with them.

In this social media era, media users are able to have interactions with the media persona that are more intimate, open, reciprocal, and frequent. More media personas are using social media platforms for personal communication, revealing their personal lives and thoughts to consumers. The more frequent and conversational that the media persona self discloses via social media results in media users feeling high levels of intimacy, loyalty, and friendship. Media users know that the chances of receiving a direct message or getting a retweet from a celebrity are highly unlikely, but the possibility gives fans a sense of intimacy and adds authenticity to one-sided parasocial relationships with their favorite personas.

Celebrity endorsements are so effective with purchase intention because parasocial relationships form such an influential bond of trust. The acceptance and trustworthiness that the media user feels towards the media persona is carried over into the brand that is being promoted. Media users feel that they understand media personas and appreciate their values and motives. This accumulation of time and knowledge acquired of the media persona translates into feelings of loyalty, which can then influence their attitudes, voting decisions, prejudices, change their ideas about reality, willingness to donate, and purchasing advertised products. Celebrities and popular social media personalities who engage in social media endorsements are referred to as influencers.

Causes and impact
Parasocial relationships are a psychological attachment in which the media persona offers a continuing relationship with the media user. They grow to depend on them, plan to interact with them, count on them much like a close friend. They acquire a history with them and believe they know the persona better than others. Media users are free to partake in the benefits of real relations with no responsibility or effort. They can control their experience or walk away from parasocial relationships freely.

A media user's bond with media personas can lead to higher self-confidence, a stronger perception of problem focused coping strategies, and a stronger sense of belonging. However these one-sided relationships can also foster an impractical body image, can reduce self-esteem, increase media consumption, and media addiction.

Parasocial relationships are seen frequently with post-retirement aged media users due to high television consumption and loss of social contacts or activities. However, adolescents are also prone to form parasocial relationships. This is attributed to puberty, the discovery of sexuality and identity, and the idolization of media stars. Women are generally more likely than men to form parasocial relationships.

Some results indicate that parasocial relationships with media personas increase because the media user is lonely, dissatisfied, emotionally unstable, and/or has unattractive relationship alternatives. Some can use these parasocial relationships as a substitute for real social contact. A media user's personality affects how they use social media and may also vary an individual's pursuit of intimacy and approach to relationships i.e. extroverts may prefer to seek social gratification through face-to-face interactions as opposed to mediated ones.

Media users use mediated communication to gratify their personal needs, such as to relax, seek pleasure, boredom, or out of habit. In this era of social media and the internet media users have constant access to on demand viewing, constant interactions on hand held mobile devices, and widespread Internet access.

Parasocial breakup
Experiencing negative emotional responses as a result of an ending parasocial relationship, i.e. death of a television persona in a series, is known as a parasocial breakup. More intense levels of parasocial breakup could be predicted by loneliness and observing media for companionship.

Jonathan Cohen, from the Department of Communications in University of Haifa, links parasocial relationships and breakups to social relationship attachment styles. The results and lasting effects of a parasocial breakup may rely on the attachment styles of the person experiencing and initiating the attachment, much like social relationships. Individuals with an anxious attachment style experience more extreme reactions to parasocial breakups, compared to avoidant and secure types.

The in-person/real life social relationship status of an individual does not affect the intensity of distress or discomfort felt in parasocial breakups.

Age, however, shows correlation with the intensity of distress at parasocial breakups, as Cohen finds young people (under the age of 20) are more susceptible to strong symptoms of PSB (Parasocial breakup).

For some people, parasocial breakups can be as simple as avoiding the content concerning the subject of the parasocial tie.

According to Cohen, the level of distress to the individuals experiencing parasocial breakup depends on the strength and extremity of the bond.

Parasocial relationships with fictional characters
Parasocial relationships with fictional characters are more intense than with nonfictional characters, because of the feeling of being completely present in a fictional world. Narrative realism—the plausibility that a fictional world and its characters could exist—and external realism—the level at which aspects of the story map to a person's real world experiences—play a part in heightening one's connections to fictional characters. If a narrative can convince a viewer that a character is plausible and/or relatable, it creates a space for the viewer to form a parasocial relationship with said character. There is a desire for camaraderie that can be built through bonding over a fictional persona.

Due to the span and breadth of media franchises such as the Harry Potter, Disney, and Star Wars series, consumers are able to engage more deeply and form strong parasocial relationships. These fictional parasocial relationships can extend further than watching the movies or reading the books into official and fan fiction websites, social media, and even extend beyond media to have an in-person experience at national and international theme park attractions.

For individuals who become very attached to fictional characters, and may or may not depend on them emotionally, even the thought of that character being removed from the story in some way (death, being written out of the story, etc) can be extremely painful.

The dread of a fictional character's death (the parasocial breakup) can be much stronger than that of a parasocial breakup with a public figure.

Parasocial relationships with fictional characters may be affected by external events relating to the actors who play them, and vice versa. For example, if a scandal were to occur with an actor, individuals who had parasocial connections to the character they played may reevaluate their opinions on the character. A parasocial breakup may occur with the fictional character, as a result of the scandal. However, the reverse, where a positive impression of an actor due to an event is created, does not apply. Fictional characters, in this case, are seen as separate from the actor and their good contributions or personality outside of the role.

Theoretical connections and measurement instruments
Rubin analyzed the process of parasocial relationship development by applying principles of uncertainty reduction theory, which states that uncertainty about others is reduced over time through communication, allowing for increased attraction and relationship growth. Other theories that apply to parasocial relationships are social penetration theory, which is based on the premise that positive, intimate interactions produce further rewards in the relationship and the uses and gratifications theory, which states that media users are goal driven and want media to gratify their needs.

In 1956, T.M. Newcomb's (1956) reinforcement theory explained that following a rewarding interaction an attraction is formed. A gratifying relationship is formed as a result of social attraction and interactive environments created by the media persona.

The most used measurement instrument for parasocial phenomena is the Parasocial Interaction Scale (PSI Scale), which was developed by Rubin, Perse, and Powell in 1985 to assess interpersonal relationships with media personalities.

Mina Tsay and Brianna Bodine developed a revised version of Rubin's scale by addressing that parasocial relationship engagement is dictated by a media users personality and motivations. They identified four distinct dimensions that address engagement with media personas from affective, cognitive, and behavioral perspectives. The dimensions assessed how people see media personas as role models, how people desire to communicate with them and learn more about them, and how familiar they are to the individuals. Tsay and Bodine noticed how greater levels of interaction can be formed between the media user and the media persona because of the shift of media and mass communication in recent years. Media users are now able to choose how they want to interact with and initiate in their own media experiences online, such as fan groups, Twitter, and character blogs.

See also

 Celebrity worship syndrome
 Contact hypothesis
 Parasocial contact hypothesis
 Personal god
 Simp
 "Stan" - 2000 single by Eminem about a fictional fan who is obsessed with the rapper.
 Stan Twitter
 Uses and gratifications theory

References

Further reading
 
 
 
 
 
 
 
 

Media studies
Social influence
Social psychology
Sociological terminology